The Trois-Saumons river water mill in Saint-Jean-Port-Joli was already in operation during the French regime in New France. An 1815 engraving by Joseph Bouchette shows the Aubert de Gaspé mill surrounded by an important industrial establishment: the Harrower distillery. Around 1980, its owner, Mr. Edmond Hudon, then in his eighties, was still operating it, but in slow motion. At the time, this mill was one of the last water mills of Quebec and Canada.

The Trois-Saumons River Watermill in Saint-Jean-Port-Joli is located upstream from route 132.

Notes and references

Further reading 
 Adam, Francine. "The water mills of Quebec, From the time of the lords to the time of today", Montreal, Éditions de l'Homme, 2009, 191 pages 
 Adam-Villeneuve, Francine. "The Watermills of the St. Lawrence Valley", Montreal, Éditions de l'Homme, 1978, 478 pages 

Watermills in Canada
Buildings and structures in Chaudière-Appalaches
L'Islet Regional County Municipality